Licking River or North Fork Licking River may refer to:

 Licking River (Kentucky), a tributary of the Ohio River
with tributary North Fork Licking River (Kentucky)
 Licking River (Ohio), a tributary of the Muskingum River then the Ohio River
with tributary North Fork Licking River (Ohio)

See also 
 Licking Creek (disambiguation)
 Licking (disambiguation)